Paradise Now is the seventh album by German band Die Krupps. It was released in 1997. It is the last album prior to the band's 8-year break-up. Guitars take a more dominant role here than on previous Die Krupps albums. The album was the last to feature the widespread use of metal guitars like previous albums, until the band released V – Metal Machine Music in 2015.

Track listing

Singles
"Fire" was released prior to the album release and its promo video was played on music television stations several times. The single contained the original version, an early mix of "Moving Beyond", a Nexus Six remix of "Fire", and an extended version of "Language of Reality (Charlie Clouser Remix)" previously released on The Final Remixes. "Rise Up" was promoted by two different promo videos, including live footage recorded in Berlin, Germany on 6 June 1997 and produced by Jörg Buttgereit; the single features the original version, a club remix of "Rise Up" and the exclusive B-side "The Last Time". "Black Beauty White Heat" was released as the final single in autumn; a promo video was made but received minimum airplay. The single contains a video edit of the title track, the original version, and the exclusive B-side "Complete Control".

Personnel
Die Krupps

 Jürgen Engler – vocals, keyboards, guitars, talkbox on Reconstruction (5) and Vortex (11)
Lee Altus – guitars
 Rüdiger Esch – bass guitar
 George Lewis – drums
 Ralf Dörper – keyboard
 Chris Lietz – programming, samplers

Technical personnel

 Michael Schwabe – mastering
 Dirk Rudolph – cover design
 Stefan Müssigbrodt – band photo

Chart positions

References 

1997 albums
Die Krupps albums
Rough Trade Records albums